The British Grand Prix 2014 is the 2014's British Grand Prix (squash), which is a tournament of the PSA World Tour event International (Prize money : 70 000 $). The event took place at the National Squash Centre in Manchester in England from 5 December to 8 December. Nick Matthew won his second British Grand Prix trophy, beating Mathieu Castagnet in the final.

Prize money and ranking points
For 2014, the prize purse was $70,000. The prize money and points breakdown is as follows:

Seeds

Draw and results

See also
PSA World Tour 2014
British Grand Prix (squash)

References

External links
PSA British Grand Prix 2012 website
British Grand Prix official website

Squash tournaments in the United Kingdom
British Grand Prix Squash
British Grand Prix Squash
2010s in Manchester
British Grand Prix Squash
Sports competitions in Manchester